The Spanish National Youth Orchestra (Joven Orquesta Nacional de España, abbreviation JONDE) is a Spanish youth orchestra.

It is a member of the European Federation of National Youth Orchestras.

See also
 Madrid Academic Orchestra
 List of youth orchestras

References

External links
 JONDE's official website

Spanish orchestras
National youth orchestras
Youth organisations based in Spain